Rev. Edith Mutale was the Zambian Ambassador to Denmark, Finland, Iceland, Norway, Sweden, Estonia, Latvia and Lithuania. from 2012 to 2017.

Before becoming ambassador, she was the spiritual leader of the Redeemed Methodist Church.

References

External links
IG petitioned over social media video clip	
William Banda denies harassing Rev Mutale

Ambassadors of Zambia to Denmark
Women ambassadors
Ambassadors of Zambia to Finland
Ambassadors of Zambia to Iceland
Ambassadors of Zambia to Norway
Ambassadors of Zambia to Sweden
Ambassadors of Zambia to Estonia
Ambassadors of Zambia to Latvia
Ambassadors of Zambia to Lithuania
Year of birth missing (living people)
Living people